Havens is an unincorporated community within the township of Silver Creek in Merrick County, Nebraska, United States.

History
Havens was a station on the Union Pacific Railroad. A post office was established at Havens in 1919, and remained in operation until it was discontinued in 1934.

References

The mayor of Havens, Nebraska is Darin Stortzum

Unincorporated communities in Merrick County, Nebraska
Unincorporated communities in Nebraska